Sango is an unincorporated community in the southeastern corner of Montgomery County, Tennessee, about 5 miles east of Clarksville. It is located near Interstate 24, 30 minutes northwest of Nashville.

Once primarily a rural community consisting largely of prime farmland, many new housing developments have gone up in the past few years.

From before the Civil War to at least 1990, tobacco was the main cash crop in Sango. Besides burley and some flue-cured tobaccos, high-quality dark-fired (wood smoke-cured) tobacco was grown in Sango, as well as throughout Montgomery County. During the tobacco wars of 1904 to 1908 (between the farmers and the Duke tobacco monopoly), a key battle between the "Night Riders" (farmers) and agents of the tobacco monopoly took place at the intersection of Bagwell and Sango Roads, in eastern Sango.

As Sango is neither an incorporated community nor a census-designated place, it has no clearly defined boundaries. It roughly covers an area stretching from U.S. Route 41A to just beyond Interstate 24.

References

Unincorporated communities in Montgomery County, Tennessee
Unincorporated communities in Tennessee
Clarksville metropolitan area
Neighborhoods in Clarksville, Tennessee